"Use Your Head" is a soulful pop song written by Barrett Strong, Wade Flemons and The Dells' Chuck Barksdale and released as a single by former Motown singer Mary Wells on the 20th Century Fox label.

Overview

Song information
The single showcases the narrator telling her lover to think before he made some costly decisions based on advice given to him by one of his best friends warning her lover to "use his head" before he ends up "losing the best love he ever had".

Release and reaction
The song was one of the few successful post-Motown singles Wells recorded. The song registered at number 34 on the Billboard Hot 100 and number 13 on the R&B singles chart.

Personnel
Lead vocal by Mary Wells
Background vocals by assorted singers
Instrumentation by assorted musicians

References

1964 singles
20th Century Fox Records singles
Mary Wells songs
Songs written by Barrett Strong
1964 songs
Songs written by Wade Flemons